Herăști is a commune located in Giurgiu County, Muntenia, Romania. It is composed of two villages, Herăști and Miloșești. Until 2004, these were part of Hotarele Commune, when they were split off to form a separate commune.

The commune is located about 35 km southeast of downtown Bucharest via route DN4, at the border between Giurgiu County and Călărași County. On the southern border of the commune flows the Argeș River, from west to east.

According to the 2011 census, the majority of the inhabitants are Romanians (76.15%), with a minority of Roma (19.29%).

Natives
 Paula Ivan
 Udriște Năsturel

References

Communes in Giurgiu County
Localities in Muntenia